The First Secretary of the Adyghe regional branch of the Communist Party of the Soviet Union was the position of highest authority in the Cherkess (Adyghe) AO (1922), Adyghe (Cherkess) AO (1922–1928), Adyghe AO (1928–1991) and the Adyghe ASSR (1991) in the Russian SFSR of the Soviet Union. The position was created on September 23, 1922, and abolished in August 1991. The First Secretary was a de facto appointed position usually by the Politburo or the General Secretary himself.

List of First Secretaries of the Adyghe Communist Party

See also
Adyghe Autonomous Oblast

Notes

Sources

1922 establishments in the Soviet Union
1991 disestablishments in the Soviet Union
Regional Committees of the Communist Party of the Soviet Union
Politics of the Republic of Adygea